Speer Goes to Hollywood is a 2020 Israeli documentary by director Vanessa Lapa, starring Albert Speer. The film premiered at the Berlin International Film Festival in February 2020 as part of the Berlinale Special. The Israeli premiere took place as part of the official competition of the Jerusalem Film Festival 2021, where Lapa won the Diamond Award for directing. The American premiere took place at the Telluride Film Festival in Colorado. The film won the Best Documentary by the Israeli Academy - Ophir Award for the year 2021.

Synopsis 
The "hero" of the film is the character of Albert Speer, an architect and good friend of Adolf Hitler who served as the Minister of Armaments and War Production of Nazi Germany from 1942 to 1945. In 1971, after the success of the bestseller Inside the Third Reich, the screenwriter Andrew Birkin from Paramount Studios was sent to adapt Speer's book into a film, which was eventually not produced. Speer Goes To Hollywood is based on recordings of forty hours of conversation between the two, documenting the process of working on the script. Speer recalls the years of the Nazis' rise to power, to his role in World War II, to the Nuremberg trials. In the interviews, Speer whitewashes his involvement in Nazi atrocities such as extermination through labour and indifferently describes his alleged lack of awareness of The Holocaust.

Reception 
On the review aggregator website Metacritic, the film has a score of 61 based on seven reviews, indicating "generally favorable reviews".

Screendaily Sarah Ward called the documentary "fascinating", adding "Lapa's documentary lays bare [Speer's] falsehoods in a dense, sober and compelling fashion". Jessica Kiang from Variety was more critical, writing that while the premise was a "potentially fascinating story", and that "a hazy picture of Speer's quite infuriating ability to obscure, evade or massage the truth... emerges", the film was "embellished" and "falls some way short".

Elad Shalev, the editor of the Israeli film portal "Seret.co.il" reports from Berlin, that Vanessa Lapa has created an excellent film in which she follows the story that the former Nazi official tries to dictate to a young screenwriter, but in a wise move she combines several timelines, including videos from the Nuremberg trials, showing the contradictions and manipulations he tries to perform, in order to rewrite history. He adds that in the film there is no explanatory narration unlike in many documentaries, but rather allowing the viewer to build the narrative by himself, and to understand who really Speer was through connecting the various parts. He concluded that it is an important and well-made documentary, particularly relevant today in which rising populist leaders, old-fashioned fanaticism and racism, and an attempt was made to rewrite history. Avner Shavit wrote in "Walla News/Calture" that this is a "crazy story", unbelievable even by the high standards to which the audience is accustomed from stories about the Holocaust, which again illustrates the composure with which the Nazis carried out their atrocities, and no less - the nonchalant innocence they tried to shake off and continue. After the screening at the Jerusalem Film Festival, Sarah Peled wrote on the independent news site "Megafon" that the film is chilling, revealing the rendering mechanism of a cold-blooded man, whose the value of human life was absent from his personality. Marlin Venig wrote in "Portfolio magazine" that she found the film unique in the way it reflects the gap between Berlin's modern showcase, and the past hidden between its bricks and pasting its pattern. She points out that unlike other Holocaust films of all kinds, Vanessa Lapa, the film's director, in precise cinematic and archival work, and one of the most beautiful made here, weaves a story from an unexpected vantage point, drawing the viewers' attention precisely to oblivion - the oblivion of the masses that can give glory to the murderers as well. Ofer Liebergel from the Israeli film blog "Srita" points out that Lapa's film is not just a film about a Nazi who tried and largely succeeded in clearing his name. It is also a film about the manipulative craft of storytelling. Precisely through a film that was not made and images that were not taken (against the background of archival material), the mechanism by which cinema can reshape consciousness was revealed. This is also reflected in the way in which Lapa, ostensibly without doing much, questions all of Speer's claims. The blog "HotJerusalem", which published an article about the recommended films for viewing at the Jerusalem Film Festival, wrote that Vanessa Lapa's new film, which follows the enigmatic character of Albert Speer, Hitler's secret man, is a fascinating and mesmerizing audio-visual document, created by an artist and archival material like recording conversations that was not intended for publication.

Historical accuracy

The Hollywood Reporter has added an Addendum to its review : "Birkin has gone on the record  to point out that Lapa’s film takes liberties with the material he recorded, and the director has acknowledged to some journalists that the lines read by the actors are compressed from the conversation on Birkin’s tapes and incorporate material from other interviews." The critic Glenn Kenny posted a lengthy article on RogerEbert.com  that poses serious questions as to the authenticity of Lapa's film. Naomi Pfefferman raised similar issues on socaljewishnews.com  as did P.J. Grisar on the Forward website . See also Andrew Lapin’s article in The Times of Israel .

See also 

 Nazi concentration camps
 Krupp

References

External links 

 
 
 
Meredith Taylor, Speer Goes to Hollywood (2020) ****. FilmUforia - The Voice of Endie Cinema.
Speer Goes to Hollywood, Jerusalem Film Festival

2020 films
Israeli documentary films
2020 documentary films
Albert Speer